Davenant International is the innovative student forum on global issues launched by the students of Davenant Foundation School in Loughton, Essex, England.  This new forum was launched in September 2005 and received widespread media coverage. Davenant Foundation School was founded in 1680 by the Reverend Ralph Davenant.  It is a Christian Ecumenical School. Ralph Davenant (Rector of the parish of St. Mary Matfellon) was passionate about social justice, he had a heart for the poor, hence the fact that he left everything he had to the poor in Whitechapel in the East End of London. The Rector bequeathed a handsome legacy for the education of forty boys and thirty girls of the parish in 'reading, writing and the casting of accounts.' You didn't have to go far to come across the poor in the time of Ralph Davenant – the almshouses were situated close by in Whitechapel Road.

Davenant International was formed against a backdrop of increased awareness and concern for social justice and a stand against world poverty. In the summer of 2005 a massive campaign, 'Make Poverty History' captured the imagination of young people not only in the United Kingdom – and even in Loughton in Essex – but right across the world. Bob Geldof launched a series of music concerts during the G8 Summit to drive home the message that people wanted to eradicate poverty. It struck a chord with Davenant students who were moved by statistics like 15,000 children die each day from hunger and starvation.

The launching of Davenant International was so much in keeping with the ideas and the personal Christian ethos of the founder of the school, Ralph Davenant.

Davenant International, now entering its fifth year is headed by Mr Lennox Morris-Whitehead, a science teacher at Davenant Foundation School.  He has now taken lead role and has attracted great new talents among the students and many have had great new ideas for fundraising and charity work.

There are many new plans in the pipe line for the global issues forum – such as a visit to parliament early next year, a trip to the EU Conference, and most importantly, a group of students from D.I. will be travelling to New York for their UN Summit, and will submit a paper on Global Warming.

Global issues 

The ground breaking Davenant International put global issues on the agenda and attracted worldwide attention. The students of Davenant Foundation School heeded the call to take global issues such as Make Poverty History, Aids, The Tsunami Disaster, Children of Chernobyl seriously.

'We live in one world. What we do affects others, and what others do affects us, as never before. To recognise that we are all members of a world community and that we all have responsibilities to each other is not romantic rhetoric, but modern economic and social reality.'
Source: Putting the world into world-class education, DfES 2004

'The school curriculum should contribute to the development of pupils' sense of identity through knowledge and understanding of the spiritual, moral, social and cultural heritages of Britain's diverse society and of the local, national....and global dimensions of their lives....the schools curriculum should...secure their commitment to sustainable development at a personal local, national and global level.'
Source: Statement on values, aims and purposes of the National Curriculum in England,QCA 2000

Davenant International has been exploring the global dimension to the curriculum – through eight concepts:

 Global Citizenship
 Conflict Resolution
 Social Justice
 Values and Perceptions
 Sustainable Development
 Interdependence
 Human Rights
 Diversity

Dignitaries from around the world sent messages of support when Davenant International was launched at Davenant Foundation School in September 2005.

Her Majesty Queen Elizabeth II sent her best wishes to all those present for a successful and enjoyable event. The former President of South Africa, Nelson Mandela also sent his warm greetings to Davenant students. Former British Prime Minister, John Major, writing to the students in Loughton hoped that they would take these issues seriously.

The Prime Minister of the United Kingdom, Tony Blair in a special message to Davenant students said: 'I am delighted to hear about the launch of 'Davenant International'. The forum will provide an opportunity for pupils to debate and discuss a range of global issues in a lively and meaningful way. It is essential that all young people be given the opportunity to learn about the global community of which they are a part. I wish the school every success in fostering the enthusiasm and creativeness of their pupils through this forum and their future work in this area.'

Lee Scott (UK politician) MP, speaking to Davenant students said: 'You are our future. You must make sure you make that difference that I think you can make.'

Headteacher Christopher Seward said: 'Congratulations to the students who have worked hard in getting Davenant International launched and to Mr. Ivan Corea (Head of Religious Education) who worked hard in giving this some vision and then making it a reality.'
Source:Wanstead and Woodford Guardian

A global focus 

Davenant International have met the Governor of the tsunami-hit Southern Province of Southern Sri Lanka Kingsley Wickramaratne, who discussed the reconstruction program with the students. Davenant Foundation School raised a substantial amount of funds for the Disaster Emergency Committee (DEC).They have debated The Da Vinci Code with the renowned speaker, Paul Harcourt and commemorated the 20th Anniversary of the world's worst nuclear disaster, Chernobyl. Students have also been in the forefront of raising funds for various charities including Christian Aid, World Vision, CAFOD and Jewish Care.

Students of Davenant International plan to go to the United Nations in New York City for a UN Student Conference on global issues. The Sri Lanka-born star Nimal Mendis released a special CD 'Light Floods In' for Davenant International – songs from the CD were featured on BBC Radio (Chris Bard Show) and Premier Radio (Breakfast Show with Tony Miles and Dave Rose) in the UK.

The school enjoys warm links with Africa and students from Umlazi School in South Africa flew in to spend time at Davenant and addressed a meeting sharing social stories on school life in South Africa. The school also participated in the British Council's Africa Dreams 2010 project. Christopher Seward, Headteacher of Davenant visited Umlazi School in Durban, South Africa along with two students in 2005. Davenant Foundation School is a leading Sports College and the Rugby team toured South Africa in the summer of 2005.

The former Bishop of Northern Uganda Rt.Rev.Gideon Oboma was another visitor to Loughton in 2006. The Bishop recounted his moving story of suffering persecution and even witnessing the murder of his own children. They were shot dead by unknown assassins dressed in military uniform. The students were touched by his message of forgiveness.

See also 

Reverend Ralph Davenant
Christopher Seward
Loughton
Whitechapel
Davenant Centre
Christian Aid
World Vision
CAFOD
Jewish Care
2004 Indian Ocean earthquake
Aids
Make Poverty History

External links 
Official School website
Davenant International website
Whitechapel
British History Online: Davenant Foundation Grammar School
Photograph of Ralph Davenant's School in the Nineteenth Century
 This is Local London Headlines: Pupils Start International Forum
Guardian: Global Issues in the Spotlight 
Nimal Mendis releases CD in aid of Davenant International — World Music Central
BBC features Davenant International CD — World Music Central
Sri Lankan Governor meets British Student Delegation — Clickwalla
Chernobyl Children's Project
The British Council's Africa Dreams 2010 Project Events

Organisations based in Essex
Student organisations in the United Kingdom